The following is a list of albums, singles, music videos and extended plays by British singer Davy Jones, who was a member of the Monkees.

Albums

Studio albums

Live albums

Compilation albums

EPs

Singles

Other songs
"(Theme From) Mr. Wong" (2000)
"Your Personal Penguin" (2008)

Music videos
"After Your Heart" (1987)
"Daydream Believer" (re-recorded: 1994)
"(Theme From) Mr. Wong" (2000)

Lead vocals with the Monkees

Notes

References

External links
 Davy Jones (musician)
 https://itunes.apple.com/us/artist/davy-jones/id24456505
 http://davyjones.bandcamp.com/

Pop music discographies
Rock music discographies
Discographies of British artists